Malaysia competed in the 2010 Asian Games in Guangzhou, China from 12 to 27 November 2010. Athletes from the Malaysia won overall 41 medals (including nine golds), and clinched tenth spot in the medal table. Zolkples Embong was the chief of the delegation.

Medal summary

Medals by sport

Multiple medalists
Malaysian competitors that have won at least two medals.

Medalists
The following Malaysian competitors won medals at the games; all dates are for November 2010.

Aquatics

Diving

Men

Women

Swimming

Men

Women

Synchronized swimming

Women

Archery

Men's recurve

Athletics

Men
Field event

Women
Track events

Field event

Badminton

Singles

Doubles

Men's team

Quarterfinal

Women's team

Round of 16

Quarterfinal

Board games

Chess

Weiqi

Xiangqi

Bowling

Singles

Doubles

Trios

Team

All-events

Masters

Boxing

Men

Cricket

Men's tournament

Women's tournament

Cue sports

Men

Women

Cycling

Mountain bike

Road

Track
Sprint

Pursuit

Time trial

Points race

Keirin

Equestrian

Dressage

Jumping

Fencing

Men

Field hockey

Men's tournament

Women's tournament

Football

Men's tournament

Golf

Men

Women

Gymnastics

Artistic
Men

Women

Rhythmic
Women

Kabaddi

Men's tournament

Women's tournament

Karate

Men

Women

Rugby sevens

Men's tournament

Sailing

Men

Women

Open

Sepaktakraw

Men

Shooting

Men

Women

Squash

Individual

Men's team

Pool B

Semifinal

Gold medal match

Ranked 2nd in final standings

Women's team

Pool A

Semifinal

Gold medal match

Ranked 1st in final standings

Table tennis

Singles

Doubles

Team

Taekwondo

Men

Women

Triathlon

Volleyball

Beach volleyball
Men

Women

Wushu

Taolu

Sanshou

References

Nations at the 2010 Asian Games
2010
Asian Games